Age of Steam is a strategy board game designed by John Bohrer under the pseudonym "Martin Wallace" and published in 2002 by Warfrog Games on license from Winsome Games. The game depicts the era when pioneering railroad companies built the tracks that transformed the American economy. Its various expansion maps adapt the base game rules, usually with some modifications, for gameplay set in various other locales, or abstracted concepts. The base game "Rust Belt" map can be played by three to six players (or as low as two if using fan-made two-player rules), usually takes between 2 and 3 hours to complete, and is intended for ages 13 and above. "Age of Steam" is a registered trademark of Winsome Games. In 2003, Age of Steam won the International Gamers Award. It supports over two hundred expansion maps, with more continually being created by its extensive fan base, as well as by the original designer.

See also
 Train game
 Railways of the World

References

External links
 

Board games introduced in 2002
Board games about history
Railroad board games
Martin Wallace (game designer) games